Slatinské Lazy is a village and municipality in Detva District, in the Banská Bystrica Region of central Slovakia.

References

External links
https://web.archive.org/web/20160305053138/http://slatinskelazy.e-obce.sk/
http://lazy.sk

Villages and municipalities in Detva District